Havatamk  (Russian «Веруем», Veruem; established in 1993) is a bilingual monthly newspaper, published in the Armenian community of Saint Petersburg, Russia.

Its editor is Armen Merujanian. It publishes mostly the news of Armenian community, articles of historical and religious content. Havatamk contains 12 pages.

References

Armenian-language newspapers
Publications established in 1993
Newspapers published in Russia